Narriearra Caryapundy Swamp National Park is a national park in northwest New South Wales.
The area includes “ephemeral wetlands and landscapes” that had not previously been included in the state’s conservation areas. The new property lies next to the Pindera Downs Aboriginal area, which is rich in cultural artefacts of Aboriginal Australians. It is the largest ever purchase of private land for conservation in the state. The Dingo Fence on the border with Queensland forms the northern boundary of the property.

The Tibooburra Local Aboriginal Land Council has been invited to suggest a name for the new park.

Various ecosystems are supported in the park, the white tree stands out from the plants, then the open salty low shrub that grows over the lush grass vegetation. Some of the exceptional animals you can meet here are red kangaroos, wedge-tailed eagles and brolgas.

References

External links
 

National parks of New South Wales
2020 establishments in Australia